(meaning "brothers" in Latin) is a musical work by the Estonian composer Arvo Pärt exemplifying his tintinnabuli style of composition. It is three-part music, written in 1977, without fixed instrumentation and has been described as a “mesmerizing set of variations on a six-bar theme combining frantic activity and sublime stillness that encapsulates Pärt's observation that "the instant and eternity are struggling within us".

Structure

Structurally, Fratres consists of a set of nine chord sequences, separated by a recurring percussion motif (the so-called "refuge"). The chord sequences themselves follow a pattern, and while the progressing chords explore a rich harmonic space, they have been generated by means of a simple formula.

Fratres is driven by three main voices. The low and high voice are each restricted to playing notes from the D harmonic minor scale (D, E, F, G, A, Bb, C#); the middle voice is restricted to the notes of the A minor triad (A, C, E). The entire piece is accompanied by drones in A and E, which are primarily heard in the refuge between each sequence.

The chords are created by the movement of the three voices: the low voice starts at C#; the high voice starts at E. Both the low and high voices are moved up or down the D harmonic minor scale at the same time, with the direction of the movement depending on the position within the sequence. The middle voice starts at A and plays a different pattern (A, E, E, C, C, C, C, A, A, E, E, C, C, A). The generated chords create harmonic ambiguity, since both C# and C are present, yielding an A major or A minor feel.

Versions
Although often performed by violin and piano, versions for larger ensembles, such as a string quartet or chamber orchestra, are also common. Performances by early music specialists have also been endorsed.

Versions for ensembles include:
chamber orchestra (1977)
four, eight, twelve, etc. cellos (1982)
string quartet (1989)
winds and percussion octet (1990)
string and percussion orchestra (1991)
band of metal instruments (2004)
three recorders, percussion, and cello or viola da gamba (2009)
saxophone quartet (2010)
Versions for solo instrument and accompaniment:
violin and piano (1980)
cello and piano (1989)
violin, string orchestra, and percussion (1992)
trombone, string orchestra, and percussion (1993)
cello, string orchestra, and percussion (1995)
guitar, string orchestra, and percussion (2000)
viola and piano (2003)
four percussionists (2006)
viola, string orchestra, and percussion (2008)

In films
The composition has been used for many films and documentaries. Notable usages include:
1987: Rachel River directed by Sandy Smolan
1992: Sneakers directed by Phil Alden Robinson
1996: Mother Night directed by Keith Gordon; Fratres is performed by Tasmin Little (violin) and Martin Roscoe (piano)
1997: Winter Sleepers directed by Tom Tykwer
1999: eight-part PBS documentary New York: A Documentary Film directed by Ric Burns
2001: A Knight's Tale directed by Brian Helgeland,
2005: six-part BBC documentary Auschwitz: The Nazis and the ‘Final Solution’ produced by Laurence Rees, used the composition performed in 1997 by the Hungarian State Opera Orchestra, conducted by Tamás Benedek
2006: La Morte Rouge directed by Victor Erice
2007: There Will Be Blood directed by Paul Thomas Anderson
2013: To the Wonder directed by Terrence Malick
2013: The Place Beyond the Pines directed by Derek Cianfrance
2013: Violette directed by Martin Provost
2015: El Club directed by Pablo Larraín
2017: documentary film Mountain directed by Jennifer Peedom
2017: Félicité directed by Alain Gomis

In other compositions 
Jazz pianist Aaron Parks incorporated elements of Fratres into his composition "Harvesting Dance," heard on his album Invisible Cinema and on Terence Blanchard's album Flow.

References

External links
 The 1997 release by the Hungarian State Opera Orchestra, used in the 2005 BBC documentary Auschwitz: The Nazis and the ‘Final Solution’
 An Official Video of London-based violinist Lana Trotovšek performing the version for violin and piano with pianist Yoko Misumi
 Free recording of Fratres for Cellos by the Columbia University Orchestra.
 A Remixed version for Violin and Piano by Beats Antique of Oakland California
 Mari Samuelsen with the Trondheim soloists NRK1 Christmas concert in Vang church 2011 and 2012

Compositions by Arvo Pärt
1977 compositions